The 2001 insurgency in Macedonia was an armed conflict which began when the ethnic Albanian National Liberation Army (NLA) militant group, formed from veterans of the Kosovo War and Insurgency in the Preševo Valley, attacked Macedonian security forces at the beginning of February 2001, and ended with the Ohrid Agreement, signed on 13 August of that same year. There were also claims that the NLA ultimately wished to see Albanian-majority areas secede from the country, though high-ranking members of the group have denied this. The conflict lasted throughout most of the year, although overall casualties remained limited to several dozen individuals on either side, according to sources from both sides of the conflict. With it, the Yugoslav Wars had reached Macedonia. The Socialist Republic of Macedonia had achieved peaceful independence from Yugoslavia in 1991.

Background
When it declared its independence from Yugoslavia on 8 September 1991, Macedonia was the only ex-Yugoslav republic that managed to secede non-violently from the federation. Because of this, Macedonia was considered one of the bright spots in the former Yugoslavia.

Although Macedonia had seceded from Yugoslavia as one of its poorest regions, socio-economic interventions undertaken by the consecutive democratically elected governments managed to improve the economic picture in the country. According to the International Crisis Group, there was nearly 3% growth in 1999. The second half of 2000 also saw steady growth, leading to a 5% GDP increase for the year. In January 2001, the government projected a budget surplus for the second year in a row. In 2000 the country's emerging middle class began buying new cars, adding extensions to apartments and planning summer vacations abroad.

Although the ethnic Macedonian majority and the largest minority, the ethnic Albanians, had co-existed uneasily both before and after the country declared independence in 1991, their relations had generally been peaceful. All of the successive Macedonian governments had included Albanian parties as coalition partners, and several problems were resolved through political dialogue. The mood was more or less optimistic until the beginning of 2001. The main cause for incidents though, was the repression by the Macedonian governments on the use of the Albanian language in Macedonia and the ban of the use of the Albanian flag in public institutions. In 1997 the Constitutional Court restricted the use of the Albanian flag in public institutions to state holidays after the mayors of Tetovo and Gostivar illegally hoisted the Albanian and Turkish flag in the town halls of Gostivar and Tetovo. the removal of the flags sparked protests.

The Macedonian Army was formed in 1992 with the withdrawal of the Yugoslav National Army under the agreement that it would take all of its equipment with it, stripping the facilities bare, and mining them for demolition, in some case even army apartments were stripped of wire and plumbing. According to Belgrade newspapers the army removed equipment worth $14 billion and $20 billion which could equip an army of 30.000. This left Macedonia severely weakened and forced Macedonia to rely on donated surplus vehicles and outdated weaponry, the World War II t-34/85 was the main battle tank of the Macedonian Army until the Bulgarian donation of 100 M -30 howitzers and 94 T-55 tanks in 1999.

In 2001 Ukraine was the only supplier of military weapons to Macedonia based on a bilateral military cooperation agreement that started in 1999. Western officials vehemently protested Ukrainian arms shipments to Macedonia, Kyiv was visited by EU Secretary-General Javier Solana, U.S. National Security Adviser Condoleezza Rice, to pressure the Ukrainian government into suspending its arms supplies to Macedonia, the Ukrainian government agreed to suspend all military sales to Macedonia in July.

Albanian demands in Macedonia
According to the 1994 census, there were 442,914 Albanians in the Republic of Macedonia, making up about 22.9% of the total population of the country (1,936,877). This made them the largest ethnic minority alongside the majority Macedonian population of 1,288,330 (66.5%). In 2001, the Albanians of Macedonia lived largely in compact settlements in the western part of Macedonia, towards the international border with Albania. They also lived in the north-western part of Macedonia, toward the border with the Yugoslav province of Serbia and the then-UN-administered Kosovo, as well as in the Macedonian capital Skopje and the city of Kumanovo. They also comprised the majority of the population in the Macedonian towns of Tetovo, Gostivar, and Debar.

Since independence, the Republic of Macedonia had been trying to focus on its internal affairs. The promotion of democracy and harmonized inter-ethnic relations had been defined as the main goal of the new state. Since the first democratic elections in 1991, the Albanians of Macedonia used all constitutional and political opportunities to play a significant political role in the country. There were several Albanian political parties, whose behavior and rhetoric (just as in the case with the parties of the Macedonian political block), depended on whether they were in the governing coalition or not. Despite these political fluctuations, the Albanian parties were included as coalition partners in all post-communist Macedonian governments.

According to the Albanian politician  Arber Xhaferi, there was systemic discrimination against Albanians in Macedonia. The Albanian flag was banned from public display. The Albanian language was taught in some schools but could not be used for official correspondence. The United States Department of State reported that the following forms of discrimination against ethnic Albanians continued to exist in Macedonia: limited access to Albanian-language media and education; poor representation in public sector jobs; poor representation in the police corps; poor representation in the military officer corps; denial of citizenship to many long-time ethnic Albanian residents of Macedonia as well as discrimination in the process of citizenship applications; and unfair drawing of voting districts which dilutes their voting strength. Because of these reasons and many more, Albanians in Macedonia began to demand greater political rights. These included making amendments to the constitution in order to declare the Albanians as a second titular nation of the country, recognizing Albanian as a second official language, and providing state support for the underground Albanian-language university in Tetovo. Albanians also claimed to represent as much as 30% and even 40% of the country's population, not the 22.9% recorded in the official June 1994 census.

In 1994, some Albanian politicians in Macedonia advocated for wider collective political rights. In 1994, a prominent manifestation of these demands was the declaration of an autonomous republic called "Ilirida" in the western part of Macedonia. Other pressing issues were the attempted creation of an Albanian language university in Tetovo (1995), declared illegal by Macedonian authorities, as well as the anti-constitutional raising of the Albanian flag in front of the municipal assemblies in Gostivar and Tetovo in 1997. Macedonians considered these two events as steps towards the creation of "parallel authorities" of the Albanians in Macedonia.

Macedonia and the Kosovo crisis

During the conflict in Kosovo in 1999, Macedonia opened its borders to thousands of Kosovo Albanian refugees who were fleeing into the country. According to figures released by the United Nations High Commissioner for Refugees (UNHCR), on 17 May there were 229,300 Kosovo Albanian refugees in Macedonia. The number of Albanian refugees in Macedonia at that stage was more than 11% of the country's population. According to the U.S. Committee for Refugees, around 360,000 Kosovo Albanian refugees repatriated in the second half of 1999.

Macedonia's ability to receive refugees was limited, because contingency planning assumed only 20,000 refugees. Despite all the difficulties, Macedonia accepted refugees according to international standards until the end of the war.

The burden of having to address the needs of 360,000 refugees took its toll on Macedonia's economy. Instead of experiencing modest growth as projected for 1999, the Macedonian economy shrank by as much as 10% of GDP for the rest of 1999. Trade with Yugoslavia, Macedonia's main trading partner, had collapsed, causing Macedonia to lose one of its most important export markets and a vital source of raw materials. Consequently, a number of factories had to close down, adding to already high unemployment. At the same time, the main transit route for Macedonian exports to most of Europe had been closed, increasing the costs for exports. State coffers, almost empty before the outbreak of the crisis, were now practically exhausted.

Macedonians were worried about the impact that more than 360,000 Albanian refugees might have on Macedonia's own ethnic mix. They were afraid that the refugees' presence could disturb the Republic's demographic balance. Macedonians were worried about the possible destructive spill-over effects that could result from the newest phase of the Kosovo conflict and also feared that they had the most to lose. As a Chicago Tribune journalist stated in March 1999, "People are afraid that after Kosovo comes Macedonia."

At the same time, insurgents from the Kosovo Liberation Army began crossing the border and entrenching themselves in Albanian-populated municipalities of the Republic. Macedonian authorities frequently intercepted and seized weapons deliveries en route to Kosovo.

Initial NLA attack
In the prelude to the conflict in late 2000, groups of armed Albanians started opening fire on Macedonian police and security forces located on the border with Yugoslavia. These events appeared to catch the Macedonian government and the international community by surprise. The first attacks occurred in the small village of Tanuševci, located in northern Macedonia near the border with Kosovo.

The conflict began on 22 January 2001, when a group of armed Albanians attacked the police station of the village Tearce near Tetovo, killing a police officer and injuring three others. Arben Xhaferi, leader of the Democratic Party of Albanians, which was a part of the Macedonian government, criticized the attack against the police station and said the following:

The Tetovo incident is part of an orchestrated action against the government and a very crude attempt to overthrow it. Regardless of who is behind it, as a political party we deeply condemn this act. This is a deeply anti-Macedonian act, but also an act against the interests of the Albanians in Macedonia.

In the same month, a group calling itself the National Liberation Army (NLA) claimed responsibility for the attacks against the police. Initial reports gave conflicting information about the NLA. Macedonian President Boris Trajkovski claimed that the rebels were primarily Kosovo Liberation Army (UÇK) members who had infiltrated the country from Kosovo. Macedonian officials accused NATO of not doing enough to disarm the Albanian insurgents, discouraging their encampment in the buffer zone (Ground Safety Zone) area between Kosovo and Serbia, or preventing their entry into Macedonia. The NLA claimed that the rebel force comprised several thousand men, coming mainly from Macedonia.

After a month of clashes, by late February, the Macedonian special police units neutralized the positions of the NLA in Tearce and Tanuševci, temporarily driving them across the border into Kosovo.

NATO surveillance of the Kosovar border 

By March 2001, NATO forces deployed in and around Kosovo began to interdict rebel supplies from areas under KFOR control, with surveillance carried out by drones. USAF Predators from the 11th Reconnaissance squadron were moved to the Skopje airport and later replaced by Task Force Hunter, a drone unit made up of IAI RQ-5 Hunter unmanned aircraft. A combined ground and aerial mission was assigned to German troops along their sector of the Macedonian-Kosovar border. Given the mountainous nature of the terrain, there were many dead spots for the observer on the ground. To overcome this disadvantage, the German military integrated the armoured-vehicle-mounted RATAC surveillance radar and the Luna X-2000 UAV. The Luna X-2000 flew a total of 175 sorties, and a number of suspected rebels were arrested. US Army forces of the 2/502nd & 3/502nd Infantry Regiments of the 101st Airborne Division(Air Assault) controlled much of the border. Infantry Squads patrolled the mountains 24/7 conducting clandestine observation and interdiction. Mortar platoons provided illumination support for night observation. On March, KFOR and the Macedonian forces led a joint operation against Albanian rebels in the Macedonian-Kosovar border region, which resulted in the capture of the village Tanuševci. US Forces coordinated with Macedonian Forces to minimize border traffic and activity.

Fighting in Tetovo

In the middle of March, NLA forces reappeared in the hills above Tetovo, a key northwest Macedonian town with an ethnic Albanian majority. The insurgents fired down on Macedonian positions using rifles, machine guns and mortars. At that point the NLA controlled at least seven villages to the north and west of Tetovo, all of which were up in the mountains and easily defensible.

On 22 March 2001, tensions soared further in Tetovo, when two Albanian men, a father and a son, were shot dead during a routine search at a police checkpoint. The incident began when their car was stopped and the officer saw the man reach for his pocket. Fearing it was a grenade, the officer panicked and ran. The man exited the car, dropped to his knees, and threw the grenade at the police checkpoint but failed to explode. A cordon of Macedonian troops, positioned behind sandbags, unleashed a volley of gunfire at the Albanian. At first he slumped against the car, then fell on the curb, dead. Moments later the father was also shot as he tried to run from the car. Despite photographic evidence of the grenade witnesses later interviewed insisted the father and son died with mobile phones in their hands, claiming that the pair were victims of revenge by police.

The strategic position of the NLA units gave them an overview of the town. The front line between the NLA and the Macedonian security forces expanded along the wooded hills adjacent to the city center to the north. The same day that a front opened in Tetovo, the NLA took control of the medieval city fortress north of the city center, and started shooting at police stationed in the urban areas. After the initial clash, the Macedonian police pushed the NLA out of Tetovo and captured the medieval fortress. The NLA were pushed back into the surrounding hills where several houses were reportedly burning. Medical officials said one person was killed and at least fourteen injured, including eleven police officers.

The government issued an ultimatum asking the National Liberation Army to lay down their arms and leave the country, or face a full-scale offensive. The NLA rejected the ultimatum, announced a unilateral ceasefire, and called for political dialogue. In response, President Trajkovski claimed that the government first had to "neutralize the terrorist threat", but agreed to start a political dialogue with legitimate Albanian political parties in Macedonia.

Prime Minister Ljubčo Georgievski declared, in a televised speech to the nation, that he would not negotiate with "terrorists". He rebuked the United States and Germany, whose troops patrolled the border from the Kosovar side as part of NATO's contingent there, for not doing enough to stop the rebels. Georgievski accused NATO of "creating a new Taliban in Europe" and allowing Albanian extremists to operate out of UN administered Kosovo.

Government counter-offensive

After five days of guerrilla attacks against government forces in and around Tetovo, on 18 March 2001, the Macedonian government ordered a general mobilization of reservists in order to execute a wider counter-attack against the National Liberation Army's positions in the hills around Tetovo.

The offensive of the Macedonian security forces was launched against NLA positions on the hillsides overlooking the city on 25 March 2001. While encountering fierce resistance from the rebels, more than two-hundred troops, aided by tanks and mortars, advanced about a kilometer up the hills fighting their way towards the village of Gajre. By early afternoon, the village of Gajre was captured by the police; they entered Šipkovica, but the NLA insurgents put up stiffer resistance at Lavce.

Macedonian government forces continued to move carefully to the north of Tetovo during the second day of the offensive (26 March 2001), consolidating their control of villages that had been held by Albanian rebels for almost two weeks. After the Macedonian security forces' artillery and infantry assault, most of the NLA insurgents had abandoned their positions farther north into the mountains stretching toward Kosovo.

On 28 March 2001, two days after the NLA was driven out from the greater part of Tetovo, Macedonian security forces launched a second offensive, this time directed at clearing the insurgents from their remaining strongholds stretching from east of Tetovo to the village of Tanuševci, north-west of Skopje. During the second offensive, the security forces attacked the NLA positions near the villages of Brest, Malino Malo, Gračani and Gošince, where clashes had taken place earlier in March before the later clashes around Tetovo. The government said the guerrillas fled northwest towards Kosovo, which they "used as a rear base".

On 31 March 2001, the Macedonian government announced an end of its offensive against the NLA armed groups. The Macedonian government claimed to have killed a dozen NLA guerrillas during the offensive. The rebels also claimed to have killed at least a dozen Macedonian border police, however this was denied by security officials. Hospital officials in Tetovo said thirty police officers and ten civilians were wounded. One civilian, an Albanian man, was killed. NLA sources however, confirmed that during the Tetovo offensive of the Macedonian army they had lost seven armed men.

The NLA's dislodging from the hills above Tetovo led to a month-long lull in the conflict.

Escalation 

During the month-long calm period, a result of the offensive by Macedonian security forces, the government launched roundtable discussions with Macedonian and Albanian political parties on legislative reforms. However, this did not end the violence. On 28 April 2001, eight Macedonian police officers were killed in the Vejce ambush in an NLA ambush. Reports concluded that the attackers must have been informed by radio about the route of the police vehicle.

Macedonian sources disclosed that the ambush was executed by Ismail Shinasi (alias Komandant Hoxha), Ceka Ilaz (alias Komandant Qori) and Ceka Bilal (alias Komandant Brada) – all three, and most of their people, were born in Kosovo and were veteran members of the Kosovo Liberation Army. Ceka Bilal was a member of the Kosovo Intelligence Agency and was one of the main organizers for weapons smuggling in Kosovo.

In reference to the attack, Macedonian President Boris Trajkovski stated, "We are fighting terrorists, not rebels, and we have exercised the utmost restraint in tackling them".

The killing of the eight Macedonian soldiers and police officers led to riots in Skopje, Bitola, and Veles, during which ethnic Macedonians attacked Albanian-owned businesses and shops. At least ten Albanian shops in the city of Bitola were destroyed, and dozens of buildings were damaged.

In order to suppress the riots, the Macedonian government imposed a curfew in Bitola, and Premier Georgievski announced that his cabinet considered declaring a state of war in order to have greater flexibility in fighting the NLA insurgents. According to the Macedonian Constitution a state of war would give enhanced powers to the President and the army, and allow for presidential rule by decree, fewer restraints on the army, the banning of demonstrations, a nationwide curfew, and sealing the country's borders. During the entire conflict, however, the United States urged Macedonia not to declare a state of war in its fight against the NLA.

Fighting in Kumanovo

In the beginning of May 2001, a large group of NLA rebels infiltrated Macedonia from Kosovo and set up bases in several villages to the north of Kumanovo. This armed group of NLA insurgents, known as the "113 Brigade of the NLA", was led by the Kosovo Albanian Fadil Nimani.

On 3 May, the NLA launched another ambush on Macedonian security forces in Vaksince, near Kumanov, and killed two Macedonian soldiers and kidnapped a third. The three soldiers were on a border patrol which was returning from routine duty when it was ambushed near the village. State radio said that the rebels had claimed the area around Vakcince as their "liberated zone".

On the same day, the Macedonian security council decided to engage in a new offensive against the NLA to drive them out of their strongholds in the villages north of Kumanovo. People in the villages held by the NLA were given until 15:00 to evacuate before Macedonian security forces would launch their offensive. Army spokesman Gjordji Trendafilov told the Associated Press that the NLA was holding thousands of villagers as human shields. The offensive started with the shelling of selected targets in Vaksince by military helicopters and field artillery.

In the next several days, Macedonian security forces shelled NLA positions in the villages of Slupčane, Orizari and Otlja. Afterwards, Macedonian police and infantry units advanced. On 7 May 2001, Macedonian Army officials announced that in the previous three days the Macedonian security forces had managed to destroy fourteen NLA entrenched positions, eight machine-gun bunkers, seven sniper nests, six control points, three arms storage facilities, and one mortar position. Army officials also stressed that during the operations only selected targets were being hit, in order to avoid civilian casualties and unnecessary material damage.

The most intensive clashes occurred during the first week of the offensive in Kumanovo, on 8 May 2001, at the entrance to the village of Slupčane. Army infantry launched an onslaught, causing insurgents to leave their positions and retreat towards Vaksince. Army helicopters then intercepted them with machine-gun fire and inflicted heavy casualties. That same day, a position of twenty NLA insurgents was destroyed by the Macedonian Army in the "Mining colony" that was located close to Lojane.

On 25 May 2001, Macedonian security forces launched the long-awaited general offensive against the NLA in Kumanovo. Fighting continued into the next day and turned into urban warfare. The police and army infantry had to fight for every house in the large villages of Vaksince and Lojane, two NLA strongholds, as the NLA resisted fiercely. A special police unit called the "Tigers", who specialised in urban counter-guerrilla fighting, was also deployed. After two weeks of heavy fighting, on 26 May 2001 the Macedonian security forces recaptured Vaksince and Lojane. During the battle for Vaksince, Macedonian forces killed Fadil Nimani, chief commander of the NLA in Kumanovo.

Macedonian troops continued their offensive towards the NLA strongholds of Slupčane and Matejce, both about thirty kilometres northeast of the capital Skopje. After several clashes in which the NLA insurgents were defeated, on 29 May 2001, Macedonian police and army units entered the village of Matejče. While searching the houses, the police found weapons and military equipment. The police also discovered a system of tunnels which provided connection between several houses. After the Macedonian security forces captured Matejče, the NLA initiated a coordinated attack on the village from the directions of Otlja, Orizare and Slupčane. The insurgents were firing machine-guns, automatic rifles, sniper rifles, and rocket propelled grenades".

During the next two days, Macedonian security forces carried out an offensive towards Slupčane, which was shelled on a daily basis. In the meantime, there was news that there was renewed fighting in the villages north of Tetovo, more than a month after the Macedonian security forces crushed the rebels in an offensive in March 2001.

On 8 June 2001, the Macedonian Army and the police launched a major new onslaught against the NLA in their strongholds in the remaining villages that had been occupied since the beginning of May 2001. The main goal of the operation was to secure the Lipkovo dam, which was held by the insurgents. The NLA closed the valves that were used for control of the outflow of water from the dam of the Lipkovo Lake This stopped the supply of water for Kumanovo causing a humanitarian crisis for the civilian population in the city. The Army captured the Lipkovo lake and pushed the NLA back into the village.

Unlike Vaksince, Matejče and other villages on the battleground, Lipkovo still had 10,000 people who were not evacuated by the government or the Red Cross. In order to prevent civilian casualties, government representatives ordered the civilians in Lipkovo to evacuate the village. However, this order was not followed since the NLA insurgents in the village would not allow the International Red Cross to evacuate the civilians. The Mayor of Lipkovo, Husamedin Halili, issued an order opposite to the government's. He told civilians that they would be safer in the basements of their houses rather than attempt to leave the village because they would find themselves in the cross-fire between the security forces and the NLA.

Because the civilians had not fled the conflict zone, in order to prevent a humanitarian catastrophe in Lipkovo, and to resume the supply of water to the village, a temporary ceasefire was brokered by the OSCE, and President Trajkovski ordered a halt to the offensive on 12 June. During the ceasefire, the supply of drinking water for Kumanovo would be turned on again, and civilians in Lipkovo would receive food, water and medicine by the OSCE.

The temporary cease-fire was violated by the NLA only hours after the agreement, when insurgents shot at a police vehicle near Tetovo. During the exchange, which lasted until dawn, nine police officers were wounded, two seriously. The NLA apologized for the attack, describing it as a "mistake". During the ceasefire, the NLA also set fire to an historic Eastern Orthodox church in Matejce, considered one of the most important cultural monuments in Kumanovo, as well as to houses of ethnic Macedonian civilians. Before Macedonian police entered the village in June 2001, the church was used as a headquarters for the NLA.

The Macedonian offensive in Kumanovo came to a temporary standstill, because a new front was opened by the NLA which pulled attention away from Kumanovo. On 13 June 2001, insurgents who had infiltrated previously declared a "free territory" in Aračinovo, a village just outside the capital Skopje.

During the month-long battles in the Kumanovo region, the Macedonian security forces managed to recapture several villages that were NLA strongholds and clear them of the insurgents' presence. According to Macedonian official claims, security forces killed at least 30 NLA insurgents, including commander Fadil Nimani, while the NLA claimed they lost 16.

Aračinovo crisis 

The Macedonian offensive in Kumanovo came to a temporary standstill, because a new front was opened by the NLA which pulled attention away from Kumanovo. On 12 June 2001, insurgents who had previously infiltrated the area declared a "free territory" in Aračinovo, a village geographically located only a few kilometers north of Skopje. Through Aračinovo, which became one of the NLA 's headquarters, Albanian rebels threatened to shell Skopje with mortars, especially the parliament and government buildings. The commander-in-chief of Aračinovo was Hoxha or Xhezair Shaqiri.

On June 22, Macedonian security forces launched a massive offensive to clear the ground of Albanian insurgents in the village. The next day, two Sukhoi 25 fighters of the Macedonian military squadron, piloted by ARM pilots , carried out the first reconnaissance operations over the village. Macedonian forces advanced rapidly, surrounding the Albanian rebels from three sides. According to General Pande Petrovski, who commanded the Aračinovo operation, the ARM had at its disposal about 20,000 soldiers with armored battalions, 54 tanks, 120-130 mortars, Mi-24 helicopters and a sufficient amount of ammunition to carry out a decisive operation and complete the disbandment of the NLA. The battle lasted only three days, and ended with two-thirds of the village under Macedonian control. Under NATO auspices, a ceasefire was agreed in order to evacuate NLA members from Aračinovo to Lipkovo.

Thus, about 350 insurgents were allowed to leave the village with their weapons, with the help of US troops serving in KFOR and NATO forces in Kosovo, the OSCE and the European Union Mission, which sparked  controversy. The Macedonian side was ordered to withdraw. As a sign of this, that same night several thousand Macedonians gathered in front of the parliament in Skopje to protest, during which the building was occupied and the protest turned into mass riots.

General Ceasefire Agreement
After mediating by OSCE and NATO and receiving increased pressure to halt hostilities, the Macedonian government agreed to NATO's request to sign an unconditional ceasefire. The ceasefire agreement was signed on 5 July 2001 by the President, by army general Pande Petrovski and by police general Risto Galevski from the Macedonian side, and by Peter Feith, a representative from NATO. NATO was the guarantor of the General Ceasefire and the same agreement was then signed with the NLA in Prizren.

The General Ceasefire Agreement required a de-militarized zone be established extending between the border with Kosovo to the southern side of the Tetovo – Jažince highway. In accordance with the agreement, the Macedonian army retreated from Tetovo, and from all of the villages that were under its control in the conflict zone, and took up new positions on the Kosovo border, and south of Tetovo. Some reinforcements were also sent to the army positions on Popova Shapka. After the relocation of the army to the new positions south of the town, there were only four police checkpoints and the police units located in the building of the SVR left in Tetovo. Police units were also removed from the villages of the conflict zone. Police remaining in the region around Tetovo after the signing of the Ceasefire were as follows: twenty in Lesok, seventy in Tearce, one hundred and twenty in Vratnica, twenty-five in Jažince, one hundred in Jegunovce, fifty in Ratae, seventy in Selce, as well as five police checkpoints with fifteen policemen each.

According to the ceasefire agreement, Macedonian security forces could open fire only when their lives were directly threatened and the return of fire had to be proportionate to any attacks by the NLA.

The agreement also envisioned a 3,000 strong NATO contingent to be deployed in the conflict zone after a political settlement was agreed between the Macedonian and Albanian political leaders. The mandate of the NATO force was to last forty-five days and the task was to disarm the NLA insurgents.

Events after the General Ceasefire
The General Ceasefire Agreement, signed on 5 July 2001, was not respected by the NLA, which proceeded to violate it constantly. According to Macedonian army records, between the signing of the General Ceasefire on 5 July until the end of August, the NLA executed one hundred and thirty-nine direct attacks against Macedonian security forces: one hundred and seventeen in Tetovo, twelve in Kumanovo and ten in the Skopje region. The Macedonian security forces returned fire seventy-four times: sixty times in Tetovo, seven in Kumanovo and seven times in the Skopje region. There were eighty-one cases of the NLA kidnapping ethnic Macedonian civilians, with sixty-one of them being released.

New clashes in Tetovo
After the signing of the ceasefire agreement, and the removal of the army from the villages north of Tetovo, NATO gave guarantees to civilians who had fled the area for Kosovo, or were internally displaced, to return to their homes. Subsequently, ethnic Albanian civilians began to return to their homes in the Tetovo villages of Selce, Lavce, Gjermo, Šipkovica, Brodec, Vešala and Vejce. The return of the civilians, and the departure of the army, created favourable conditions for the NLA to reappear in these villages. Army observation positions spotted insurgents digging defensive positions around these villages, but the soldiers were not given permission to open fire.

The first major incident caused by the NLA was an artillery attack on Tetovo on 7 July 2001, only two days after the signing of the ceasefire. From their positions north of Tetovo, NLA insurgents began an artillery bombardment of the city. Mortar grenades were launched on the northern part of the city, towards the city stadium, and the central shopping mall "Tetovčanka". Insurgents continued firing on police checkpoints in the city with RPG launchers and automatic weapons from the direction of the villages of Gjermo and Poroj. The Macedonian police, stationed in the city, answered this fire with all of their available weapons. At the same time there were attempts by the insurgents to bomb the police station in Tearce.

During the weekend, the NLA entered the ethnic Macedonian villages of Brezno and Varvara and started digging in positions. Insurgents also started digging in above the big ethnic Macedonian village of Lesok. The Ministry of the Interior recorded the movements but did not intervene. But it warned the EU and OSCE monitors to take countermeasures. From their positions in Varvara, the insurgents opened fire with automatic weapons on Lesok and on the police positions at Jažince. During these incidents the police did not react, respecting the Ceasefire agreement. There were also sightings of the NLA establishing checkpoints on roads to the east of Tetovo.

On 9 July, it was announced in the media that when the insurgents first started shooting towards Lesok, a police unit came to the villagers and armed them with firearms and ammunition to defend themselves, because the police were not allowed to intervene. The armed villagers organised a village militia, took up defensive positions, and repelled the NLA's attempts to enter the village for two days. On the same day, groups of Tetovo Macedonians went to see the President to demand that the army be ordered to enter Tetovo and expel the insurgents from the ethnic Macedonian villages of Setole, Otunje, Jadoarce, Brezno, Varvara and Jelošnik so that civilians could be returned to their homes. They claimed that the NLA attacked the remaining Macedonian villages in the region in order to ethnically cleanse the region of Macedonians. They also stated that they thought that the General Ceasefire Agreement was "an unthought-of act which may, and already is, very harmful to the Macedonian population in the Tetovo region".

Toward the middle of July, the NLA entered the Tetovo suburb of Drenovec, which was already emptied of army and police personnel. Armed citizens organized control points in the suburb and started building positions in close proximity to former police positions at the stadium. Because of the fact the NLA used the Ceasefire to infiltrate Tetovo and come in close to the security forces' positions, General Pande Petrovski issued an order allowing the security forces to open fire if the insurgents came within 200 meters of their positions.

On 21 July, Macedonian army radar detected a NATO Chinook helicopter entering Macedonian air space from Kosovo and dropping a container on the village of Šipkovica (which after 5 July had fallen into NLA hands). Fifteen minutes after the first drop-off, another NATO helicopter dropped another container in the area of the village of Brodec. After dropping the cargo, the helicopters returned towards Kosovo. Macedonian air defence did not open fire on the helicopters, but the Macedonian Ministry of Defence demanded an official answer from KFOR about the two incidents. NATO officials initially denied any involvement, but later confirmed that they dropped the containers but stated that the cargo was not designated for the NLA, but for use by KFOR.

On 22 July, NLA insurgent positions in the villages north of Tetovo, as well as in the Drenovec suburb, started a massive onslaught against the Macedonian police near the villages as well as inside Tetovo. The attacks started at 11:00 with an attack on the police positions at the city stadium, Drenovec 2, and the army barracks on the outskirts of the city. The police answered fire leading to an outburst of heavy fighting. Fighting continued uninterrupted for a second day, and the insurgents moved slowly toward the city stadium, and Drenovec 2 suburb, and approached the city centre. On the same day the Defence Minister warned the NLA to withdraw from ground it had taken during the truce or face an all-out attack.

On the third day, the NLA seized control of the soccer stadium and the fighting spread toward the army positions on the Kosovo border. This triggered the army to intervene. On 24 July, the army started an attack on the NLA by shelling villages from which the rebels had advanced, in the mountains above Tetovo. Fighting also continued towards the Kosovo border. Army Suhoi fighter planes were also sent on a reconnaissance mission over NLA positions. At noon, backed by army artillery, police units attacked NLA positions in Drenovec 2 and the Tetovo teqe, starting the most serious of the clashes in Tetovo. In the attack the Macedonian police destroyed several insurgent positions in Drenovec 2, Strmno and Poroj, pushing the NLA away from the centre. During the battle for Drenovec 2, a police bullet seriously wounded the NLA commander who was in charge of the attack on Tetovo – the Kosovar Rahim Beqiri, also known as Komandant Roki. He was transported immediately to the Pristina hospital, where he died one week later.

The battle ended on 24 July 2001 after a night of fighting. The next day Tetovo was quiet while ethnic Albanian insurgents built up defences with sandbags. Across the graveyard Macedonian security forces were stationing armoured personnel carriers. After the battle there was a line dividing Tetovo with the city stadium being the"border". Although there were individual armed provocations until the end of 2001, the positions held by both sides inside the city of Tetovo, after the battle of 24 July, did not change. The biggest incident after the clashes on 24 July, happened on 7 August when the NLA made another attempt to take control of the city. The attack failed when the special units of the police launched a counter-strike and forced the insurgents back to their former positions.

During the July clashes in Tetovo, five members of the Macedonian security forces lost their lives. NLA sources confirm that they lost seventeen insurgents during the battle – the biggest loss being the death of Komandant Roki.

Karpalak and the "Tetovo-Jažince" operation
Toward the end of July and the beginning of August, NLA increased its presence in the demilitarised area around the Tetovo-Jažince highway, after ethnically cleansing five ethnic Macedonian villages located next to the highway. The Minister of the Interior and the Prime Minister were putting pressure on the President to order a full-scale offensive by the army to retake the territory which NLA occupied during the Ceasefire period after 5 July. This territory included most of the villages north of Tetovo, the Tetovo suburb of Drenovec, as well as an area north of the Tetovo-Jažince highway. The Prime Minister was continuing to push for a state of war to be declared in order to give the army the necessary freedom to resolve the crisis by military means. General Pande Petrovski prepared the plan of the offensive named "Operation Polog", but President Trajkovski refused to sign it. According to Petrovski, Trajkovski was constantly being assured by NATO and US envoys that the NLA would retreat peacefully from the area once the political dialog with the Albanian political parties intensified.

At the beginning of August 2001, Macedonian Intelligence Service received information that a special unit of the NLA had infiltrated the suburb of Čair in Skopje. The ten member group was led by the Albanian national Lefter Bicaj (known as Komandant Telli), and, according to the intelligence information, the group was tasked with organising terrorist attacks within the capitol. On 7 August, police discovered the group's hiding place and conducted a raid during which five members of the NLA group were killed and five others arrested. In the apartment police found a great number of: automatic rifles, handguns, mortars, explosive devices and grenade launchers.

The next day, on the way to Tetovo, a military convoy sending reinforcements to army positions around Tetovo, was attacked in an ambush set by NLA insurgents. Ten Macedonian soldiers lost their lives in the attack. They were attacked on the Tetovo-Jažince highway next to the Karpalak locale.

On 9 August, thirty NLA insurgents kidnapped five civil workers who were busy doing construction work on the Tetovo-Jažince highway. These people were brutally beaten and their skin was cut off with knives. When they were released, all of them were taken to intensive care.

On the same day, the President authorised a joint military-police action aimed at liberating and securing the Tetovo-Jažince area, which was demilitarised after the Ceasefire Agreement of 5 July. The operation started early on 10 August, and after several clashes with the insurgents, the Tetovo-Jažince area was retaken from the NLA and security check-points were established. The Tetovo-Skopje highway was also completely secured and the de-mining teams cleared the area of landmines while a strong police presence secured the road from diversions.

Battle at Raduša
The battle at Raduša was the worst violation of the General Ceasefire Agreement signed between the Republic of Macedonia and NATO (in the role of a guarantor for the NLA). The battle consisted of a series of clashes between the Macedonian security forces and the NLA insurgents in the area around the village of Raduša, near the border with Kosovo. The first incidents began near the end of June and escalated in the middle of August 2001.

The first clash took place on 20 June 2001, when four policemen from the Raduša police station discovered an NLA camp of forty insurgents on the steps of Žeden mountain, during a patrol of the terrain on the border. The police patrol opened fire killing one insurgent and wounding another. The patrol called on air support which came immediately and pushed the insurgents towards Kosovo.

On 23 July, one of the most dramatic single events in the conflict occurred when another police border patrol was attacked in an NLA ambush near Raduša. The police patrol was led by Aco Stojanovski, the Deputy-Commander of the Raduša police station. The insurgents fired at the police vehicle with RPG rockets, throwing three policemen out of the car and leaving one inside. The NLA attempted to approach the badly wounded policemen. Commander Stojanovski's firing six rounds from an AK-47 at the insurgents saved them until soldiers from the Raduša border post arrived and repelled the NLA with fire from an armored personnel carrier. After the conflict, commander Stojanovski became the president of the Union of Army and Police veterans of the Conflict in Macedonia.

In the early hours of 10 August 2001, the NLA launched an offensive from the area of Krivenik in the Kosovo Municipality of Đeneral Janković (Hani i Elezit), invading the territory of Macedonia in the region of Raduša. The offensive took place during the ceasefire period, only days before the signing of the Ohrid Framework Agreement. The first actions began at 20:00 the same day with a mortar attack on the Raduša police station, located at the entrance of the village. The police station was manned by only thirty-five policemen. The security forces returned fire and the shootout lasted until 2:00 A.M. Afterwards, the NLA initiated an infantry attack which was repelled by the police. During the attack one police officer was injured.

According to information obtained by the Macedonian intelligence service, the attack was conducted by more than six hundred NLA insurgents, supported by volunteers from the Kosovo Protection Corps. The Corps came from the town of Krivenik in Kosovo and crossed the Macedonian border into Raduša during the night. According to the same information, the NLA plan of action was to neutralise the security forces in the Raduša sector, then penetrate southwards and capture the Rašče water spring which feeds the Macedonian capital Skopje with drinking water. Cutting water supplies would create a humanitarian crisis in the city.

The Ministry of Interior single-handedly declared an alert condition and sent detachments of the "Tiger" special police unit to dig in and secure the Rašče spring. Other detachments of the "Tiger" were sent to rescue thirty-five policemen surrounded at the Raduša station. Because of the lack of artillery support, and the overwhelming numbers of the NLA encirclement, they dug–in at positions outside Raduša. The Minister of Interior Ljube Boškoski and Prime Minister Ljubčo Georgievski asked President Trajkovski for an immediate activation of the army in order to neutralise the invasion from Kosovo. The president, however, encouraged by the NATO and EU envoys, was concentrated on reaching a political solution that respected the conditions of the 5 July Ceasefire Agreement. He asked that the police not respond to provocations in order to avoid an escalation of the conflict. Meanwhile, the encircled policemen in the Raduša station were left on their own.

In a letter to the UN secretary general Kofi Annan the Macedonian Prime Minister Ljupco Georgievski said:

Yesterday's and today's armed aggression from Kosovo by more than 600 members of the Kosovo Protection Corps against the territorial integrity of Macedonia, yesterday's siege of the village of Radusa and its bombardment by weapons stationed on the territory of Kosovo, for me personally, as a Prime Minister of the Republic of Macedonia, are nothing else but an official declaration of war against my country by an international protectorate, Kosovo, i.e. the Kosovo Protection Corps, which – unfortunately – is part of your civilian administration of the United Nations in Kosovo.

On 11 August, the second day of the battle, the NLA began the most serious attack against the security forces in the Skopje region. A column of two hundred Albanian insurgents attacked the Raduša army border post with mortar, automatic rifle and sniper fire. The Raduša army border post, located between the villages of Kučkovo and Raduša, was manned by twenty-five soldiers with mortars, automatic rifles, one tank, and three armoured personnel carriers. At the same time, the NLA conducted another assault attack on the encircled police station at the Raduša village. The army and police returned fire and, during the heavy fighting, the NLA managed to set fire to the petrol barrels within the barracks of the army border post. The insurgents managed to come so close that they started cutting the wire fence. The soldiers repelled all of the attacks on the army border post, and witnesses state that they could observe the insurgents carrying away the bodies of numerous dead and wounded. The policemen also managed to repel all of the attacks made on 11 August. Western media later showed images a Macedonian T-55 tank captured by the Albanian rebels in Raduša.

On the third day of the battles, 12 August, under great pressure to act by the Minister of Interior and the Prime Minister, the army decided to intervene in the battle. The army involved itself by sending military helicopters followed by two efficient flights by Macedonian Air Force Sukhoi Su-25s. The air bombardment, and the consequent approach of the army infantry and armed vehicles, put an end to the advances by the NLA, and brought a turnaround on the battlefield. NLA insurgents withdrew to their trenches and earth bunkers at their initial positions around the village of Raduša, or escaped to Kosovo. After breaking the encirclement, the army extracted the thirty-five policemen, with their equipment, and repositioned them in a more strategic position at the abandoned buildings on the Raduša mine road towards Skopje. One hundred and seventy policemen were added to reinforce this new position. The army also reinforced the already established positions for the defence of the Rašče water springs.

Although during the first two days of the battle there was a serious lack of coordination between the Macedonian military and police, the army was pressed to intervene to prevent the NLA from taking control of the whole territory around Raduša. Thus, the NLA failed to connect territories under its control in the Tetovo and Lipkovo regions, which would have created a single "liberated territory" in the north-west of Macedonia. On the other hand, the outcome of the battle further fuelled members of the Macedonian police force who were in favour of a military solution of the conflict. On 13 August Ljube Boskovski stated:

At this moment it is necessary to initiate the largest offensive so far, due to the danger that terrorists will widen the conflict.

The Macedonian security forces had a dozen men wounded in the battle but sustained no fatalities. Although Macedonian sources state that there were tens, if not hundreds of dead in the battle, Albanian sources do not give a precise number. However, at the location of the battle, there is a memorial stating "To the fallen NLA soldiers of 2001".

Ljuboten police action
On 10 August 2001, eight Macedonian soldiers were killed in a landmine explosion near the capital Skopje. The blast occurred on the road between the villages of Ljubanci and Ljuboten, five kilometres from the outskirts of Skopje, when a convoy of army trucks ran over three landmines. Another six soldiers were wounded in the explosion.

The next morning, the police sent a patrol to search the village of Ljuboten after receiving intelligence that a group of three NLA insurgents had moved into the village, after having planted the mines on the road. When the police entered the village, three grenades from a 120mm mortar were shot at them from the northern part of the village. Then a detachment of the reservist "Lion" police unit was called in as reinforcements, backed by a police TM-170 armoured personnel carrier. According to police witnesses, when the police entered the village, insurgents opened fire on them with automatic rifles from four houses. The police called an army mortar battery not far away from the village for artillery fire to be directed at the four houses in the village. The army mortar unit fired sixty grenades, both 120mm and 80mm, at the four designated targets. According to CNN two helicopter gunships were also called to shell the village, whose hundreds of residents were hiding in basements.

When the shelling stopped, the police entered the village on 12 August. OSCE observers could hear gunfire and explosions coming from inside the village. Three people were killed by the police inside the village, and four were killed while trying to escape by snipers located in positions outside the village. Around one hundred men from the village were arrested by the police and taken to the neighbouring village of Mirkovci, where they were subjected to the paraffin glove test (a test used to determine whether someone has recently shot a firearm.) Twenty-seven men tested positive and were detained and sentenced for terrorism. The rest were released. Evidence later indicated that the detainees were subjected to severe beatings, as a result of which one person had to be hospitalised.

The Ljuboten police action is considered one of the most controversial episodes of the 2001 conflict, and was among the four ICTY cases arising from the conflict.

The police action in Ljuboten coincided with the security forces' counter-offensive in Radusa. It was part of the Premier's and Minister of Interior's efforts to resume the general offensive against the NLA which was stopped after 5 July 2001. However, the general offensive was not conducted because on 13 August, one day after the Ljuboten action, the ethnic Macedonian and ethnic Albanian political official representatives in Macedonia signed the Ohrid Framework Agreement, putting an official end to the hostilities. Although the NLA was not included in the negotiations, nor in the signing of the document, the NLA leaders agreed to disarm themselves to NATO troops.

Ohrid Framework agreement

The Ohrid Framework Agreement, which was signed on 13 August 2001, put an official end to the armed conflict. The agreement set the groundwork for increasing the rights of ethnic Albanians in Macedonia. The Agreement also included provisions for altering the official languages of the country, with any language spoken by over 20% of the population becoming co-official with the Macedonian language on the municipal level. Currently only Albanian, spoken by approximately 25% of the population, fulfils this criterion. According to the document, the version in English is the only authentic version of the Ohrid Framework Agreement.

The Agreement was preceded by the Ohrid discussions, a series of talks between Albanian and Macedonian representatives, along with representatives from the United States and European Union. The talks took place in Ohrid in the south-west of Macedonia. The agreement was negotiated by Zoran Jolevski, Secretary General of President Boris Trajkovski. The Macedonian side was represented by the VMRO-DPMNE and the SDSM, while the Albanian side was represented by the DPA and the PDP. Although actively participating in armed conflict, the National Liberation Army did not participate directly in the talks.

Aftermath

Ceasefire and disarmament
After the Ohrid Agreement, the rebels agreed to a ceasefire in June, however there were other agreements in August, before both sides settled on a final one in January 2002. Under the Ohrid Agreement, the Macedonian government pledged to improve the rights of Albanians in the country. Those rights included making Albanian the second official language, and increasing the participation of ethnic Albanians in government institutions, the police, and the army. Most importantly, under the Ohrid Agreement, the Macedonian government agreed to a new model of decentralization.

The Albanian side agreed to give up any separatist demands and to fully recognize all Macedonian institutions. In addition, according to this agreement, the NLA was to disarm and hand over its weapons to NATO.

Operation "Essential Harvest" was officially launched on 22 August and effectively started on 27 August. This 30-day mission involved approximately 3,500 NATO and Macedonian troops, whose objective was to disarm the NLA and to destroy their weapons. Just hours after NATO wrapped up the operation, Ali Ahmeti told reporters attending a news conference in the rebel stronghold of Šipkovica, that he was dissolving the National Liberation Army and that it was time for ethnic reconciliation.

Several months after the end of the conflict, some armed provocations persisted. Small bombings and shootings occurred. The most serious provocations happened when three Macedonian police officers were killed in an ambush by ethnic Albanian gunmen on 12 November 2001.

Casualties and displacement
Casualty figures remain uncertain. By 19 March 2001, the BBC reported that Macedonian security forces had claimed five of their soldiers were killed, while the NLA claimed that it had killed eleven. No definitive Albanian casualty figures were cited at the time. On 25 December 2001, the Alternative Information Network cited figures of sixty-three deaths claimed by Macedonian security forces for their side and sixty-four deaths claimed by the NLA for their insurgents.  About sixty ethnic Albanian civilians are thought to have been killed while possibly ten ethnic Macedonians died during the conflict. Macedonian authorities did not release figures for the latter at the time. , the fate of twenty missing civilians, thirteen ethnic Macedonians, six ethnic Albanians and one Bulgarian citizen remains unknown. By August 2001, the number of people displaced by the war reached 170,000, mostly Macedonians. Of these 170,000, 74,000 were displaced internally. , 2,600 people remained displaced. Two European Union monitors were killed by the explosion of a mine during the conflict. One British soldier was also killed in the course of Operation Harvest when the armoured Land Rover he was driving was pelted with concrete lumps by a hostile crowd.

During Operation harvest the NLA was in possession of two tanks and 2 APC's which they claim were captured from the Macedonian army. According to Macedonian General Pande Petrovski one t-55 tank was destroyed by friendly fire in the village of Matejce and another got stuck in a small river was abandoned and disabled by the crew to prevent it being used which the NLA later found and presented as a war trophy.

According to the Macedonian authorities, the Macedonian security forces lost 70 men and between 700 and 800 NLA were killed.

NLA Freedom Museum
As a result of the conflict, some Albanians of the Čair Municipality in Skopje established a 'Museum of Freedom' in 2008, presenting what they consider the battles of the Albanians in the region from the period of the Prizren League in 1878 until the 2001 insurgency. It is also known as the NLA Museum and commemorates those who died during the conflict. Items include paramilitary clothing and insurgent flags used in 2001. Many Albanians see it as a non-military continuation of the uprising. Former NLA leader turned politician, Ali Ahmeti stated at the opening ceremony: "My heart tells me that history is being born right here, in Skopje, the ancient city in the heart of Dardania. Our patriots have fought for it for centuries, but it is us today who have the destiny to celebrate the opening of the museum. Fighters from Kosovo are here to congratulate us ..."

Resurgence

In April 2010, a weapons caché was discovered near the border with Serbia, it included uniforms with Kosovo Liberation Army (UÇK) insignia. On 12 May, four militants were killed by the Macedonian police in a village close to Kosovo. The police seized four bags of explosives, anti-infantry mines and other weapons. Those killed were wearing black uniforms and UÇK insignia was found in the vehicle. In the following days, as Macedonia petitioned Kosovo for any information that it might have possessed, seventy ethnic-Albanian criminals, linked to the Albanian Mafia, were arrested for illegal weapons possession. Among the arrested were four men, a father and his three sons. They are believed to be linked to the men that were killed on 12 May.

On 12 April 2012, five ethnic Macedonian civilians were shot and killed at a man-made lake near the village of Smilkovci, outside the Macedonian capital Skopje.

On 19 September 2014, a group of Macedonian Albanians assembled in Skopje and proclaimed the creation of the Republic of Ilirida, consisting of the western half of Macedonia.

On 28 October 2014, NLA insurgents fired two rocket-propelled grenades at a Skopje government building.

On 21 April 2015, 40 masked and armed ethnic Albanian fighters wearing the insignia of Kosovo Liberation Army took control of the Gošince border post. Threatening to kill the four police officers manning the outpost unless they leave the border area immediately, they said that they want to have their own state and that they do not accept the Ohrid Agreements. After a few hours, Macedonian forces regained control of the village.

On 9 May 2015, eight Macedonian police officers and 14 gunmen were killed in the fighting in an ethnic Albanian part of the town of Kumanovo. Those named were members of Kosovo Liberation Army. In an announcement released by NLA's spokesperson from Gostivar, NLA has taken responsibility for the attacks on the Macedonian police.

Alleged war crimes
Alleged war crimes included incidents such as a three-day operation by Macedonian police against the ethnic Albanian village of Ljuboten, from 10 to 12 August 2001, which left ten civilians dead and resulted in the arrest of more than one hundred ethnic-Albanian men, many of whom were severely beaten and tortured while in police custody. According to the Macedonian government, there was an insurgent presence in the village; however, a Human Rights Watch investigation on the ground in Ljuboten found no direct evidence of this. These events led to the trial of the then-Macedonian Minister of Internal Affairs, Ljube Boškoski, in the International War Crime Tribunal in The Hague. He was acquitted in 2008, but his co-defendant Johan Tarčulovski was found guilty; both verdicts were upheld in 2010.

The bombing of the 13th-century Orthodox monastery Sveti Atanasij in the village of Lesok is considered a war crime by some. However, no one has ever claimed responsibility for the attack. Albanian guerrilla officials have dismissed all responsibility and placed the blame on Macedonian special forces, saying it was another poor attempt to link the NLA to terrorism. However, upon closer inspection, it was discovered that near the rubble that had once been one of the most revered religious sites for the Macedonian Orthodox Church, there lay a dead donkey, its bloated body daubed with red paint spelling out the letters UÇK, the Albanian abbreviation for the rebel National Liberation Army. Three uniformed NLA guerrillas in an observation post overlooking the monastery said they had logged the explosion at 3.10 am. They said they had not seen those responsible, but believed that they were Macedonians from the nearby Macedonian village of Rate. This incident is disputed to this day and the monastery is now under-going reconstruction. On the other hand, the Macedonian forces themselves destroyed a mosque in the village of Neprošteno. The mosque was rebuilt in 2003 with funding from the EU.

The monastery at Matejče, near Kumanovo, was also damaged in the fighting and the church of St. Virgin Hodegetria was vandalized by the Albanian insurgents.

The Macedonian government also claimed the Vejce ambush, in which Albanian insurgents ambushed and killed eight Macedonian soldiers, to be a war crime. According to these claims, soldiers captured by the insurgents were, executed, mutilated, and burned. The claims were not verified by international observers, and to this day, the bodies have not been released to the public or to civilian investigators and autopsies were carried out in a military morgue. However, news of the deaths sparked local riots against ethnic-Albanians in several towns and cities across Macedonia, and such revolts included burning and vandalizing shops and mosques.

Bibliography

Macedonian authors

Testimonies 2001 by General Pande Petrovski, Сведоштва 2001 од Генерал Панде Петровски (2006)
Unfinished Peace by Jadranka Kostova, Незавршен мир од Јадранка Костова (2003)
2001: War with two faces by Mančo Mitevski, 2001: Војна со две лица од Манчо Митевски (2008)
Not war nor peace by Ljupka Kočovska, Ниту војна ниту мир од Љупка Кочовска (2010)
In focus of civil war in Macedonia by Jordan Jordanov, Во фокусот на граѓанската војна во Македонија од Јордан Јорданов (2003)
Road of truth by Svetlan Antiḱ Jovčevska, Патот на вистината од Светлана Антиќ Јовчевска (2004)
My struggle for Macedonia by Ljube Boshkovski, Мојата борба за Македонија од Љубе Бошковски (2004)
First victim by Ljube Profiloski, Прва жртва од Љубе Профилоски
NLA terrorist paramilitary in Macedonia by Ivan Babanovski, ОНА терористичка паравојска во Македонија, Иван Бабановски, ВЕДА, Скопје, 2002 година
Intelligence in counterinsurgency by Aleksandar Iliev, Разузнавање во противбунтовништво, Александар Илиев, ЛУБ Благој Јанков Мучето, Струмица, 2014 година

Macedonian authors of Albanian descent

Testimonies of the general by Gëzim Ostreni, Сведоштва на Генералот од Гзим Острени

Foreign authors

Fires over Tetovo by Rišard Bilski, Пожари над Тетово од Ришард Билски (2003)
NLA-message and hope by Petrit Menaj, ОНА порака и надеж од Петрит Менај, Фондација институт отворено општество, Кома, Скопје, 2008

See also

2012 Republic of Macedonia inter-ethnic violence
Albanian nationalism in North Macedonia
Insurgency in the Preševo Valley
Kumanovo shootings
Operation Essential Harvest
Operation Mountain Storm

References

External links
Casualties and displacement
. Video footage of the fighting activities.
"Macedonia: Step back from the abyss", BBC, 29 December 2001
"Macedonia: Understanding History, Preventing Future Conflict", United States Institute of Peace, Special Report No. 115, February 2004
"Macedonia's Civil War: 'Made in the USA'", Antiwar.com, 20 August 2001
Chronology of the war
 CTV
Battles −9/2001
Battles – 3/2001

Macedonia On War Footing Over Kosovo Border Provocations
November Battles, Start of War, January 2, 2001
2002 attacks
Boskovki interview
War in the Balkans, again?

Conflicts in 2001
21st-century rebellions
Wars involving North Macedonia
Wars involving the Balkans
Modern history of North Macedonia
2001 in the Republic of Macedonia
Insurgencies in Europe
 
Macedonia
Albanian separatism
Terrorism in North Macedonia